Manja is a town in the country of Jordan, near the capital Amman. It is popular for its racing track.

References

Populated places in Jordan